Marianne Farley (born Marianne Therien in Montreal, Quebec) is a Canadian actress and director, best known for her roles as Gem Whitman in Imaginaerum, Nicole Breen in This Life, Dillan Vanderson in Vampire High and Stella and Nancy in The Intruder.

Early life
Marianne Farley grew up in Quebec. She is bilingual (English and French). Her family was an artistic family that made a lot of music. So Farley started to sing from a very young age. When she was 19 she met a couple with their own record company. She worked together with them to release the single Histoire sans prénom and a music album. Several songs of hers made it into the top 10. She signed a record contract in France, where the album was never released. Later Farley wanted to become an actress. So she went to several workshops and learned acting.

Career
In 1999 Farley played Stella and Nancy Brooke in The Intruder.

When Meghan Ory wanted to leave Vampire High in 2002 the producers needed to introduce another main character, Dillan Vanderson. Farley auditioned for the part and was cast after three auditions. Since the producers were searching for a girl who looked quirky Farley dyed her then blonde hair red. This look was inspired by the character Lola (Franka Potente) from the German film Run Lola Run. However, the series was canceled and so Farley remained only six episodes in the series.

In 2014 Farley could be seen as Anna in Uvanga, directed by Hélène Cousineau and Madeline Ivalu. From 2014 to 2015 Farley played Judith Laramée in the series Mémoires vives from Radio-Canada. In 2015 she could be seen as Julia in four episodes of the series Heroes Reborn. She plays Julia, the wife of Noah Bennet (Jack Coleman), one of the main figures of the series. From 2015 to 2016 she starred as Nicole Breen in the TV series This Life. Farley later said that she loved playing Nicole since she was a bit of everything. She was very emotional and tried to be in control in which she did not succeed much. Farley enjoyed the complexity of her character.

Farley has also worked as a producer, director and screenwriter. In 2015 Farley directed the short film Saccage. In 2017 she wrote and directed the short film Marguerite. This film has won 20 prestigious film awards, has been selected for over 70 film festivals, and was named as a shortlisted Academy Award for Best Live Action Short Film nominee at the 91st Academy Awards.

Private life 
Farley is a mother.

Filmography

Film

Television

See also
 List of female film and television directors
 List of LGBT-related films directed by women

References

External links

Living people
Actresses from Montreal
Canadian film actresses
Canadian television actresses
Year of birth missing (living people)
Canadian women film directors
Film directors from Montreal